The 2006 United States Senate election in Florida was held November 7, 2006. Incumbent Democratic U.S. Senator Bill Nelson won re-election to a second term.

Republican primary

Candidates 
 LeRoy Collins Jr., retired naval officer and son of former Governor LeRoy Collins
 Katherine Harris, U.S. Representative
 Will McBride, attorney
 Peter Monroe, businessman and former COO of the Federal Housing Administration

Endorsements 
 The Bradenton Herald:  McBride
 Florida (Jacksonville) Times-Union: Collins or Monroe
 Gainesville Sun: Collins
 Lakeland Ledger: Collins
 Miami Herald: Collins
 Naples Daily News: Collins
 Orlando Sentinel: McBride
 Palm Beach Post: Monroe
 Sarasota Herald-Tribune: no endorsement
 South Florida (Fort Lauderdale) Sun Sentinel: Monroe
 St. Petersburg Times: Collins
 Tampa Tribune: Collins

Polling

Results

General election

Candidates

Democrat 

 Bill Nelson, incumbent U.S. Senator

Republican 
 Katherine Harris, former Florida Secretary of State and former U.S. Representative

Independents 
 Floyd Ray Frazier
 Brian Moore, retired health care executive and former congressional candidate
 Belinda Noah
 Roy Tanner

Write-ins 
 Alexander Grosholz
 Lawrence Scott
 Bernard Senter

Campaign 
The organization Citizens for Responsibility and Ethics in Washington (CREW), which monitors political corruption, complained to the Federal Elections Commission (FEC) in October 2006 that the Bacardi beverage company had illegally used corporate resources in support of a fundraising event for Nelson in 2005.  CREW had previously filed a similar complaint concerning a Bacardi fundraising event for Republican Senator Mel Martinez, an event that raised as much as $60,000 for Martinez's campaign.  The amended complaint alleged that, on both occasions, Bacardi violated the Federal Election Campaign Act and FEC regulations by soliciting contributions from a list of the corporation’s vendors.

Endorsements 
In a rare move, all twenty-two of Florida's daily newspapers supported Nelson, while none supported Harris in the general election.
 Bradenton Herald: Bill Nelson
 Charlotte Sun-Herald: Bill Nelson
 Daytona Beach News-Journal: Bill Nelson
 Florida Times-Union: Bill Nelson
 Fort Myers News-Press: Bill Nelson
 Gainesville Sun: Bill Nelson
 Lakeland Ledger: Bill Nelson
 Miami Herald: Bill Nelson
 Naples Daily News: Bill Nelson
 Orlando Sentinel: Bill Nelson
 Palm Beach Post: Bill Nelson
 Pensacola News Journal: Bill Nelson
 Saint Petersburg Times: Bill Nelson
 Sarasota Herald-Tribune: Bill Nelson
 Scripps Treasure Coast Newspapers: Bill Nelson
 South Florida Sun-Sentinel: Bill Nelson
 Tallahassee Democrat: Bill Nelson
 Tampa Tribune: Bill Nelson

Debates 
Complete video of debate, October 23, 2006
Complete video of debate, November 1, 2006

Predictions

Polling

Results 
As expected, Nelson was easily reelected. He won with 60.3% of the vote winning by 1,064,421 votes or 22.2%, and carried 57 of Florida's 67 counties. Nelson was projected the winner right when the polls closed at 7 P.M. EST.

See also 
 2006 United States Senate elections
 2006 Florida gubernatorial election
 2006 Florida state elections
 2006 United States House of Representatives elections in Florida

References

External links 
Debates
Debate, October 23, 2006

Campaign Websites (Archived)
 Bill Nelson for Senate
 Katherine Harris for Senate
 Leroy Collins for Senate
 Peter Monroe for Senate
 Ray Frazier for Senate
 Brian Moore for Senate
 Belinda Noah for Senate
 Roy Tanner for Senate
 Lawrence Scott for Senate

Florida
2006
2006 Florida elections